The Ihuraua River is a river of the southern North Island of New Zealand. It flows north from its source southeast of Eketahuna, joining with several streams to become the Tiraumea River north of Alfredton.

See also
List of rivers of New Zealand

References

Rivers of the Wellington Region
Rivers of New Zealand